First Investment Bank or Fibank (Parva investitsionna banka), founded on 8 October 1993, is currently (Q1'13) the third largest Bulgarian bank (measured in total assets). The bank is the mother bank of a financial group on the Balkans - it has a branch in Albania with 10 offices, one in Cyprus, as well as a subsidiary bank in North Macedonia (UNIBank). First Investment Bank also controls CaSys International - an international card operator based in Skopje, North Macedonia.

In Bulgaria, it has 21 branches and 68 offices throughout the country. Its clients include 380,000 individuals and 21,000 corporate bodies. The main shareholders in the bank as of August 2018 are Tseko Minev and Ivaylo Mutafchiev, owners of 42.5% of the bank's share capital.

See also

 List of banks in Bulgaria

References

External links
 First Investment Bank website
 UNIBank website 
 First Investment Bank Albania website
 CaSys International

Banks of Bulgaria
Banks established in 1993
Companies based in Sofia
Bulgarian brands
Bulgarian companies established in 1993